Julius Marvin Montgomery was an American technical professional and politician. He was the first black student enrolled at Brevard Engineering College, now Florida Institute of Technology and the first black technical professional working for the RCA Development Lab at Cape Canaveral in 1956 during the early days of the Space Race. He was also the first black city council member of Melbourne, Florida.

Early life and education
After graduating from Tuskegee Institute in Alabama, Montgomery served in the United States Air Force, where he received a first-class radio  operator's license. After moving to Florida, he attended the Brevard Engineering College.

Death
Montgomery died on January 22, 2020, at a nursing home in Melbourne, Florida, a few days after the Florida Institute of Technology awarded him an honorary doctorate of humane letters. He was 90 years old. The cause of death was heart failure, according to his daughter Gaye Montgomery.

References

1929 births
2020 deaths
Florida city council members
Florida Institute of Technology alumni
People from Melbourne, Florida
People in the space industry
Tuskegee Institute alumni
United States Air Force airmen